Boletus bresidolanus is a species of bolete fungus in the family Boletaceae. Found in France, it was described as new to science in 1970.

See also
List of Boletus species

References

External links

bresidolanus
Fungi described in 1970
Fungi of Europe